The 4th constituency of Seine-et-Marne is a French legislative constituency in the Seine-et-Marne département.

Description

The 4th constituency of Seine-et-Marne is the largest constituency in the department and covers its rural east.

The seat has been solidly conservative since 1988. Christian Jacob won the seat in 1997 served as a minister under Jean-Pierre Raffarin and as President of the UMP group in the National Assembly since 2010.

Historic representation

Election results

2022

 
 
 
 
 
 
 
|-
| colspan="8" bgcolor="#E9E9E9"|
|-

2017

 
 
 
 
 
 
|-
| colspan="8" bgcolor="#E9E9E9"|
|-

2012

 
 
 
 
|-
| colspan="8" bgcolor="#E9E9E9"|
|-

2007

 
 
 
 
 
 
 
|-
| colspan="8" bgcolor="#E9E9E9"|
|-

2002

 
 
 
 
 
|-
| colspan="8" bgcolor="#E9E9E9"|
|-

1997

 
 
 
 
 
 
 
 
|-
| colspan="8" bgcolor="#E9E9E9"|
|-

Sources

Official results of French elections from 2002: "Résultats électoraux officiels en France" (in French).

4